Raragala Island is one of the Wessel Islands in Northern Territory, Australia. Its area is 89 km².

References 

Islands of the Northern Territory